The Brooklyn Academy of Fine Arts was a small, short-lived art academy located at 85 Court Street in the New York City borough of Brooklyn.  The sole instructor at the academy was Michael Falanga. The school closed in 1945.

See also

 Culture of New York City
 Education in New York City
 List of art schools

References

Educational institutions in the United States with year of establishment missing
Educational institutions disestablished in 1945
1945 disestablishments in New York (state)
Defunct art schools
Art schools in New York City
Defunct schools in New York City
Universities and colleges in Brooklyn